The 2021 Upper Austria Ladies Linz was a women's tennis tournament played on indoor hard courts. It was the 31st edition of the Linz Open, and was part of the  WTA 250 series of the 2021 WTA Tour. It was held at the TipsArena Linz in Linz, Austria, from 6 to 12 November 2021.

Champions

Singles 

  Alison Riske def.  Jaqueline Cristian, 2–6, 6–2, 7–5.

This was Riske's third WTA Tour title, and first of the year.

Doubles 

  Natela Dzalamidze /  Kamilla Rakhimova def.  Wang Xinyu /  Zheng Saisai 6–4, 6–2

Points and prize money

Point distribution

Prize money

1 Qualifiers prize money is also the Round of 32 prize money
* per team

Singles entrants

Seeds 

 Rankings as of November 1, 2021

Other entrants 
The following players received wildcards into the singles main draw:
  Julia Grabher
  Simona Halep
  Sinja Kraus
  Emma Raducanu

The following player received entry using a protected ranking:
  Mona Barthel

The following players received entry from the qualifying draw:
  Kateryna Kozlova
  Harmony Tan
  Lesia Tsurenko
  Wang Xinyu

The following player received entry as lucky loser:
  Jaqueline Cristian

Withdrawals 
Before the tournament
  Irina-Camelia Begu → replaced by  Aliaksandra Sasnovich
  Sorana Cîrstea → replaced by  Jaqueline Cristian
  Caroline Garcia → replaced by  Zheng Saisai
  Viktorija Golubic → replaced by  Mona Barthel
  Kaia Kanepi → replaced by  Greet Minnen
  Marta Kostyuk → replaced by  Fiona Ferro
  Ann Li → replaced by  Clara Burel
  Petra Martić → replaced by  Kamilla Rakhimova
  Camila Osorio → replaced by  Rebecca Peterson
  Ajla Tomljanović → replaced by  Océane Dodin
  Zhang Shuai → replaced by  Dayana Yastremska

Doubles entrants

Seeds 

1 Rankings as of November 1, 2021

Other entrants 
The following pair received a wildcard into the doubles main draw:
  Julia Grabher /  Sinja Kraus 

The following pairs received entry using protected rankings:
  Mona Barthel /  Hsieh Yu-chieh
  Irina Khromacheva /  Lidziya Marozava

References

External links 
 

2021 WTA Tour
2021
Upper Austria Ladies Linz
Upper Austria Ladies Linz